Marco Paulo Coimbra de Abreu (born 8 December 1974) is an Angolan retired footballer who played as a left back.

Football career
Abreu was born in Lubango, Huíla Province, to a White African-Portuguese family. He left for Portugal at the age of two and, during his professional career, represented Académico de Viseu FC, C.F. União, C.D. Trofense, Varzim SC, S.C. Covilhã, A.D. Ovarense, S.C. Olhanense, Portimonense S.C. and S.C. Espinho, playing mainly in the second division where he amassed totals of 204 games and nine goals over the course of nine seasons; he added 154/15 in the third level.

Internationally, Abreu appeared for Angola at the 2006 FIFA World Cup as a replacement for suspended Yamba Asha, but made no appearances in the tournament held in Germany. He had made his debut at the 2006 Africa Cup of Nations in Egypt, where he was also injured.

References

External links

1974 births
Living people
People from Lubango
Angolan footballers
Association football defenders
Angola international footballers
2006 Africa Cup of Nations players
2006 FIFA World Cup players
Angolan people of Portuguese descent
Angolan emigrants to Portugal
Citizens of Portugal through descent
Portuguese footballers
Académico de Viseu F.C. players
C.F. União players
C.D. Trofense players
Varzim S.C. players
S.C. Covilhã players
A.D. Ovarense players
S.C. Olhanense players
Portimonense S.C. players
S.C. Espinho players
Liga Portugal 2 players
Segunda Divisão players
Portuguese sportspeople of Angolan descent
A.A. Avanca players